Stibadocera is a genus of crane fly in the family Cylindrotomidae. Stibadocera are unusual for crane flies in that the males have very long antenna, sometimes as long as the body. Most species are very small (6–10 mm).

Biology
The larvae of the genus Stibadocera live on mosses. Adults are to be found in damp tropical habitats.

Distribution
Sumatra, Papua New Guinea, Malaysia, Java, Irian Jaya, India & Philippines

Species
S. bullans Enderlein, 1912
S. daymanensis Alexander, 1960
S. fasciata Edwards, 1926
S. luteipennis Alexander, 1962
S. metallica Alexander, 1915
S. nana Alexander, 1961
S. nigronitida Alexander, 1972
S. opalizans Alexander, 1931
S. papuana Alexander, 1948
S. perangusta Alexander, 1961
S. pumila Alexander, 1930
S. quadricellula (Brunetti, 1911)

References

Cylindrotomidae
Diptera of Asia
Diptera of Australasia